{{Infobox person
| name          = Mathias Gnädinger
| image         =Mathias Gnädinger.jpg
| birth_date    = 
| birth_place   = Ramsen, Switzerland
| death_date    = 
| death_place   = Zürich, Switzerland
| occupation    = Stage and film actor
| years_active  = 1968–2015
| notable_works = Leo Sonnyboy (1989)Journey of Hope (1990)Kinder der Landstrasse (1992)Sternenberg (2004)Usfahrt Oerlike (2015)
}}

Mathias Gnädinger (25 March 1941 – 3 April 2015) was a Swiss stage and film actor.

Career
Initially a typesetter and typographer, Gnädinger began his acting training at the Bühnenstudio Zürich (now part of the Zurich University of the Arts) from 1962 to 1966.

His first role in Swiss television was in 1968. He starred in Leo Sonnyboy, Das Boot ist voll, Journey of Hope and the Austrian-German-Swiss co-production Kinder der Landstrasse. Since 1988, he had worked as a freelance actor.

Gnädinger starred in about 70 character roles in television and German-language cinema, as well as stage actor in about 130 theater productions, among them at the Burgtheater in Vienna, the Schaubühne in Berlin, and the Schauspielhaus and Theater am Neumarkt in Zürich when latter was established in 1966. The Swiss drama film Usfahrt Oerlike was released in January 2015, and is the second last film starring Gnädinger alongside Jörg Schneider. According to the film's director Paul Riniker, a sequel was planned, but neither it nor another project focusing on the 74-year-old actor will be realized, as Gnädinger died on 3 April 2015.

In Mathias Gnädinger's last film, Der grosse Sommer, directed by Stefan Jäger, he plays Anton Sommer, a former Swiss wrestling champion in the footsteps of a Sumo wrestler in Japan. The production works in Japan were documented by 10vor10, and Gnädiger was absolutely fascinated by the old Japanese tradition, and his ten years old co-star Loïc Sho of Swiss-Japanese origin. Gnädinger said he got in touch with Swiss wrestling only once, as a boy. Ursula Gnädinger assisted her husband at the production works as make-up artist. The comedy is scheduled for release in the second half of 2015.

Personal life
Born in Ramsen, Schaffhausen, Gnädinger lived in Stein am Rhein. He had four brothers and was raised on a farm. His mother was of Sicilian-Appenzell origin; she was the daughter of a typesetter and was educated in St. Gallen. Gnädinger's father was a farmer and the town clerk of Ramsen. Gnädinger married his former childhood sweetheart, Ursula, in 2004. He organized his career as an actor without an agency and managed everything himself. His wife Ursula later became his manager and assisted him in all aspects. "For him, this late love was a godsend."

Death
Gnädinger died on 3 April 2015 in Zürich from cardiac complications and acute respiratory distress syndrome. The funeral took place within the family; a public acknowledgment was celebrated at Münster Schaffhausen on 16 April 2015.

Awards (excerpt)
 2014: Georg-Fischer Award for his lifetime work (Lebenswerk)
 2012: Lifetime Award by the Swiss Television SRF (Lebenswerk)
 2005: Swiss Film Prize, nominated Best Performance in a Leading Role (Bester Hauptdarsteller/Beste Hauptdarstellerin) for Ricordare Anna (2004) 
 2003: Swiss Film Prize, won Best Actor (Bester Darsteller) for Big Deal (2002) 
 2002: Swiss Film Prize nomination as Best Actor (Bester Darsteller) for Lieber Brad (2001)  
 1996: Hans Reinhart-Ring
 1996: Prix Walo, won Actors on TV and film (Schauspieler)

Filmography

 1968: Die vier Brüder (Ich, TV) - Die vier Brüder #2 
 1970: Das Verhör von Habana - Ein Selbstbildnis der Konterrevolution (TV) - Pablo Prganvides Parada
 1976: Die plötzliche Einsamkeit des Konrad Steiner - Sanitäter
 1977: San Gottardo - Shop keeper
 1977: Em Lehme si Letscht - Willi
 1978: Trilogie 1848 - Der Galgensteiger (TV) - Johannes Gross
 1978: Heidi (TV series, 5 episodes) - Miller / Meunier
 1979: Der Chinese (TV) - Kaltenegger
 1980:  (TV)
 1980: The Boat Is Full - Franz Flueckiger
 1981: Der Erfinder - Spekulant 
 1982:  - Nachtclubbesitzer
 1983: Der Gemeindepräsident - Hans Sturzenegger
 1986: Triumph der Liebe (TV) 
 1986: Du mich auch - Romeos Vater
 1987: The Winner Takes All (TV) - Lirchmair
 1987: Der elegante Hund (TV series) 
 1988: Spielergeschichten (TV series)
 1988: Arbeitersaga (TV series) - Dr. Guido M. Lizenti
 1989: La nuit de l'eclusier - Koebi
 1989: Pestalozzi's Mountain - Büttel
 1989: Gekauftes Glück - 'Hirschen'-Wirt
 1989: Leo Sonnyboy - Leo Mangold
 1990–2002: Tatort (TV series, 4 episodes) - Heinz Osburg / Alex Kerger / Schneider /  Walter Howald
 1990: Klassäzämekunft - Emil Brandenberger
 1990: Bingo - Bingo
 1990: Reise der Hoffnung - Truckdriver Ramser
 1990: Der Berg - Manser
 1990: Winckelmanns Reisen - Berner
 1991: Tassilo - Ein Fall für sich (TV series) - Archivar
 1992: Kinder der Landstrasse - Roger Kessel
 1992: Eurocops (TV series) - Armin Luchsinger
 1993: Probefahrt ins Paradies - Freddie
 1993: Der grüne Heinrich - L'oncle
 1993: Justiz - Police Chief
 1994: Joe & Marie - Marie's father
 1994: Magic Hunter - Police Chief
 1994: Tschäss  
 1996: Tresko - Der Maulwurf (TV)
 1996: Deutschlandlied (TV miniseries) - Hermann Sternke
 2000: WerAngstWolf  
 2000: Comedian - Stephan Ernst
 2001: Lieber Brad - Urs
 2001: Im Namen der Gerechtigkeit (TV) - Adalbert Jentsch
 2002: Big Deal (TV) - Walter Oberholzer
 2002: Andreas Hofer - Die Freiheit des Adlers (TV) - Maréchal François Joseph Lefebvre - duc de Dantzig
 2003: Spital in Angst (TV) - Kommandant Bertschinger
 2003–2006: Lüthi und Blanc (TV series, 169 episodes) - Ruedi Egger
 2004: Sternenberg 2004: Der Untergang - Reichsmarschall Hermann Göring
 2004: Hunkeler: Das Paar im Kahn - Peter Hunkeler
 2004: Ricordare Anna - Viktor Looser
 2005: Hunkeler: Tod einer Ärztin - Peter Hunkeler
 2005: Die Vogelpredigt 
 2005: Steinschlag (TV) 
 2007: Marmorera - Gregor Sonderegger
 2008: Hunkeler macht Sachen (TV) - Peter Hunkeler
 2009: Hunkeler und der Fall Livius (TV) - Peter Hunkeler
 2010: Länger leben - Max Wanner
 2011: Silberkiesel - Hunkeler tritt ab - Kommissar Hunkeler
 2012: Hunkeler und die Augen des Ödipus (TV) - Peter Hunkeler
 2014–2015: Der Bestatter (TV series, 8 episodes) - Louis Lauener
 2015: Usfahrt Oerlike - Willi Keller
 2015: Der grosse Sommer'' - Anton Sommer (final film role)

External links 
 
 Mathias Gnädinger on the website of the Swiss television SRF

References 

1941 births
2015 deaths
20th-century Swiss male actors
21st-century Swiss male actors
Burials in Switzerland
Deaths from pneumonia in Switzerland
Male actors from Zürich
People from the canton of Schaffhausen
Swiss male film actors
Swiss male stage actors
Swiss male television actors